"Wake Up My Love" is a song by English rock musician George Harrison from his 1982 album Gone Troppo. Released as the A-side of the album's lead single, it peaked at number 53 in the United States but failed to chart in Britain. Harrison included the track on his 1989 compilation album Best of Dark Horse.

As with his previous single, "Teardrops", the song was an attempt by Harrison to make his music sound contemporary, to appease the commercial concerns of Warner Bros. Records. Disillusioned with the 1980s pop scene, Harrison refused to promote the release and withdrew from music-making for over four years. In the opinion of Ultimate Classic Rock critic Nick DeRiso, "Wake Up My Love" sounds "as dated an item as any Beatles-related '80s release this side of [Paul McCartney's] 'Spies Like Us'".

Cashbox said that it is "one of [Harrison's] more aggressive pop productions."  Billboard called it an "offbeat pop tune, quite accessible, with synthesizers providing both the basic rhythm track and sci-fi sound effects."

Personnel
 George Harrison – vocals, guitars, bass
 Mike Moran – synthesizer, piano
 Henry Spinetti – drums
 Ray Cooper – percussion

References

External links
 

George Harrison songs
Song recordings produced by George Harrison
1982 singles
Music published by Oops Publishing and Ganga Publishing, B.V.
Dark Horse Records singles
1982 songs